Women's History Review is a bimonthly peer-reviewed academic journal of women's history published by Routledge. The editor-in-chief is June Purvis (University of Portsmouth) and Sharon Crozier-De Rosa is deputy editor.

Abstracting and indexing 
The journal is abstracted and indexed in 
 America: History and Life
 British Humanities Index
 CSA Worldwide Political Science Abstracts
 Historical Abstracts
 Sociological Abstracts
 Studies on Women and Gender Abstracts
 Arts & Humanities Citation Index.

External links 
 

English-language journals
History journals
Bimonthly journals
Publications with year of establishment missing
Routledge academic journals
Women's studies journals